KEKS (103.1 FM "KISS 103.1") is a radio station broadcasting a CHR format. Licensed to Olpe, Kansas, the station serves the Emporia, Kansas area. The station is currently owned by MyTown Media, LLC.

History
KEKS signed on in November 2006 as a CHR station under the ownership of Andrew Wachter. KEKS quickly transformed into an adult contemporary station as "Channel 103.1" in 2007, then reverted to CHR in 2008. My Town Media bought the station in 2012. KEKS signed on an HD2 channel simulcasting KSNP originally. After a stint with country music as "My Country 94.1" (which was broadcast on translator station K231AY (94.1 FM), before it was relocated to Wichita), the HD2 subchannel currently simulcasts sister station KHDL (99.5 FM), which initially ESPN Radio programming until its flip to country as "My Country 99.5" on October 1, 2019.

References

External links
KISS 103.1 Website
MyTown Media, LLC. Website

Lyon County, Kansas
EKS
Contemporary hit radio stations in the United States
Radio stations established in 2007